Mads Larsen (born 20 September 2001) is a Danish professional footballer who plays for Esbjerg fB.

Career
Larsen signed his first youth contract on his 15th birthday. Larsen took the step from the U17 squad directly to the first team squad. On 19 November 2017, Larsen got his official debut for Esbjerg fB in the Danish 1st Division, making him the youngest debutant in the history of the club, with his 16 years and two months of age. He came on the pitch from the bench with half an hour left of a game against Brabrand IF. Larsen played eight league games and scored one goal in the 2017/18 season and helped the team gain promotion to the Danish Superliga. He was permanently promoted to the first team squad for the 2018/19 season.

On 19 Augustus 2018, he made his debut in the Danish Superliga for Esbjerg, making him the youngest debutant in the Superliga in the history of the club in a 1–0 victory against Brøndby IF.

On 24 July 2021, Larsen was appointed new team captain by head coach Peter Hyballa. Four days later, on 28 July, 21 of Esbjerg's first-team players including Larsen sent an open letter to club management, expressing "strong distrust" to Hyballa. The letter, which was also published in several media outlets, mentions several episodes where Hyballa had physically or mentally abused players. As a result, he was benched for the next game against FC Helsingør on 31 July, with Nicklas Strunck taking over as captain. In the following game on 7 August against Lyngby Boldklub, Larsen returned as team captain.

References

External links
Mads Larsen at DBU
Mads Larsen at Esbjerg fB's website

2001 births
Living people
People from Esbjerg
Danish men's footballers
Esbjerg fB players
Danish Superliga players
Danish 1st Division players
Danish 2nd Division players
Association football midfielders
Denmark youth international footballers
Sportspeople from the Region of Southern Denmark